Giovanni Gotti (30 August 1912 – 7 April 1988) was an Italian racing cyclist. He won stage 3 of the 1938 Giro d'Italia.

References

External links
 

1912 births
1988 deaths
Italian male cyclists
Italian Giro d'Italia stage winners
Cyclists from the Province of Bergamo